Chalat (also Romanized as Chelat; also known as Kalt) is a village in Qilab Rural District, Alvar-e Garmsiri District, Andimeshk County, Khuzestan Province, Iran. At the 2006 census, its population was 65, in 14 families.

References 

Populated places in Andimeshk County